FacilitySource, is a technology-based, facility management firm headquartered in Columbus, Ohio, US. The company provides facility management and management solutions to businesses in retail, banking, logistics, and healthcare industries based in North America.

History

FacilitySource has locations in Phoenix, Arizona, Charlotte, North Carolina, and Columbus, Ohio, US. It was founded and incorporated in 2005. FacilitySource was founded as a Software as a service (SaaS) solution for retail operations with multiple locations.

By 2012, the company built a network of subcontractors across North America.

FacilitySource started offering facility management services, performed by what it refers to as its ‘Elite Network’. These third-party service providers are located across the country. It serves clients across brands in healthcare, banking, retail, logistics and other sectors, like The Home Depot, Starbucks, Walmart, Autozone, Dollar General, LBrands, Speedway, FedEx Office, T-Mobile and other entities such as retailers, restaurants, e-commerce retailers, etc.

In April 2019, FacilitySource was named US Supplier Company of the Year at the PRSM2019 National Conference.

Products and Services 
The services provided by them are operational and financial reports based on their data repository, gathered for over 13 years and from over 120,000 client locations.

fmPilot

It is a web-based Computerized maintenance management system (CMMS), that coordinates facility management activities by controlling work orders and service provider management and collects the data necessary to optimize maintenance processes. This eliminates wasteful expenditure and provides sophisticated budgeting and reporting functionality.

fmSurvey

fmSurvey is an asset inventory which acts as an information collection tool and data repository. It provides location information in a web-based platform, making it possible to track equipment conditions and maintenance activities across multiple locations across the network.

Energy management services (EMS)

It is a service involving around the year monitoring, issue resolution and overall reporting of the energy investments. It helps in reduction of unnecessary service calls, optimization of energy use and increase in energy savings.

Funding and Acquisition

In October 2011, FacilitySource received $10 million of development capital from BMO Capital Markets' Mezzanine fund for growth plans which included continued investment in its software applications to support management solutions, expansion of its offices at new locations and strategic acquisitions.

In July, 2017, FacilitySource got a $400,000 grant from the State of Ohio, US, to add 272 jobs and $13.5 million in payroll, to its existing 323 jobs at its Columbus headquarters.

Acquisition by Warburg Pincus 
In 2012, Warburg Pincus acquired a majority stake in the company. The terms of the deal were undisclosed.

Acquisition by the CBRE group 
In June, 2018, the CBRE Group acquired FacilitySource from Warburg Pincus for $290 million.
Through this deal, CBRE acquired Facility Source’s software technology platform, vendor development program, 24/7 operation centers and a supply chain of thousands of third-party service providers to fix operational problems and address requests at all office, industrial and retail buildings that CBRE manages in the US.

References 

Management consulting firms of the United States
Companies established in 2005
Consulting firms established in 2005
Technology companies of the United States
2005 establishments in the United States
2005 establishments in Ohio
Companies based in the Columbus, Ohio metropolitan area